Yuri Anatolyevich Kuznetsov (born 25 January 1974) is a former Russian professional footballer.

Club career
He made his professional debut in the Russian Second Division in 1992 for FC Aleks Angarsk.

Honours
 Russian Premier League bronze: 1997.
 Russian Cup finalist: 1997.

European club competitions
With FC Dynamo Moscow.

 1995–96 UEFA Cup Winners' Cup: 5 games, 1 goal.
 1996–97 UEFA Cup: 3 games.

References

1974 births
Living people
People from Angarsk
Russian footballers
Russian expatriate footballers
Expatriate footballers in Belarus
Russian Premier League players
Association football midfielders
FC Dynamo Moscow players
FC Shinnik Yaroslavl players
FC Arsenal Tula players
FC Gomel players
FC Zvezda Irkutsk players
FC Yenisey Krasnoyarsk players
Sportspeople from Irkutsk Oblast